Fusarium incarnatum is a fungal plant pathogen.

See also
 List of pigeonpea diseases
 List of cucurbit diseases

References

incarnatum
Fungal plant pathogens and diseases
Vegetable diseases
Fungi described in 1875
Taxa named by John Baptiste Henri Joseph Desmazières